In ancient Greek religion, Hera (in Ionic and Homeric Greek) is the goddess of marriage, women and family, and the protector of women during childbirth. In Greek mythology, she is queen of the twelve Olympians and Mount Olympus, sister and wife of Zeus, and daughter of the Titans Cronus and Rhea. One of her defining characteristics in myth is her jealous and vengeful nature in dealing with any who offend her, especially Zeus' numerous adulterous lovers and illegitimate offspring.

Her iconography usually presents her as a dignified, matronly figure, upright or enthroned, crowned with a polos or diadem, sometimes veiled as a married woman. She is the patron goddess of lawful marriage. She presides over weddings, blesses and legalises marital unions, and protects women from harm during childbirth. Her sacred animals include the cow, cuckoo and the peacock. She is sometimes shown holding a pomegranate, as an emblem of immortality. Her Roman counterpart is Juno.

Etymology
The name of Hera has several possible and mutually exclusive etymologies; one possibility is to connect it with Greek ὥρα hōra, season, and to interpret it as ripe for marriage and according to Plato ἐρατή eratē, "beloved" as Zeus is said to have married her for love. According to Plutarch, Hera was an allegorical name and an anagram of aēr (ἀήρ, "air"). So begins the section on Hera in Walter Burkert's Greek Religion. In a note, he records other scholars' arguments "for the meaning Mistress as a feminine to Heros, Master." John Chadwick, a decipherer of Linear B, remarks "her name may be connected with hērōs, ἥρως, 'hero', but that is no help since it too is etymologically obscure." A. J. van Windekens, offers "young cow, heifer", which is consonant with Hera's common epithet βοῶπις (boōpis, "cow-eyed"). R. S. P. Beekes has suggested a Pre-Greek origin. Her name is attested in Mycenaean Greek written in the Linear B syllabic script as  e-ra, appearing on tablets found in Pylos and Thebes, as well in the Cypriotic dialect in the dative e-ra-i.

Andreas Willi addresses some additional possibilities: "M. Peters, starts from the verbal root… ‘to catch, take’... and posits a related root noun… with the meaning ‘(violent) taking’ > ‘rape’ > ‘booty’... This root noun would have served as the basis for an exocentric derivative… ‘belonging/relating to the rape, of the rape’ whose feminine… would have meant ‘she of the rape… Formally this theory is unobjectionable (especially if the postulated noun were, despite the divergent semantics, reflected in Homeric… ‘to gratify’ < ‘to pay tribute’...), but it seems most uncertain whether in the eyes of a (Proto-)Greek a raped (booty) woman could have become one of the legitimate wives who are protected by Hera. Moreover, the derivation presupposes that Hera herself must have been imagined as a ‘raped girl’ at some point…

The PIE... could be originally either (a) ‘the female who is attached/coupled’ or (b) ‘the female who attaches herself’... both socially and physically or emotionally."

Cult

Hera may have been the first deity to whom the Greeks dedicated an enclosed roofed temple sanctuary, at Samos about 800 BCE. It was replaced later by the Heraion of Samos, one of the largest of all Greek temples (altars were in front of the temples under the open sky). There were many temples built on this site, so the evidence is somewhat confusing, and archaeological dates are uncertain.

The temple created by the Rhoecus sculptors and architects was destroyed between 570 and 560 BCE. This was replaced by the Polycratean temple of 540–530 BCE. In one of these temples, we see a forest of 155 columns. There is also no evidence of tiles on this temple suggesting either the temple was never finished or that the temple was open to the sky.

Earlier sanctuaries, whose dedication to Hera is less certain, were of the Mycenaean type called "house sanctuaries". Samos excavations have revealed votive offerings, many of them late 8th and 7th centuries BCE, which show that Hera at Samos was not merely a local Greek goddess of the Aegean: the museum there contains figures of gods and suppliants and other votive offerings from Armenia, Babylon, Iran, Assyria, Egypt, testimony to the reputation which this sanctuary of Hera enjoyed and to the large influx of pilgrims. Compared to this mighty goddess, who also possessed the earliest temple at Olympia and two of the great fifth and sixth-century temples of Paestum, the termagant of Homer and the myths is an "almost... comic figure", according to Burkert.

Though the greatest and earliest free-standing temple to Hera was the Heraion of Samos, in the Greek mainland Hera was especially worshipped as "Argive Hera" (Hera Argeia) at her sanctuary that stood between the former Mycenaean city-states of Argos and Mycenae, where the festivals in her honor called Heraia were celebrated. "The three cities I love best," the ox-eyed Queen of Heaven declares in the Iliad, book iv, "are Argos, Sparta and Mycenae of the broad streets." There were also temples to Hera in Olympia, Corinth, Tiryns, Perachora and the sacred island of Delos. In Magna Graecia, two Doric temples to Hera were constructed at Paestum, about 550 BCE and about 450 BCE. One of them, long called the Temple of Poseidon was identified in the 1950s as a temple of Hera.

In Euboea, the festival of the Great Daedala, sacred to Hera, was celebrated on a sixty-year cycle.

Hera's importance in the early archaic period is attested by the large building projects undertaken in her honor. The temples of Hera in the two main centers of her cult, the Heraion of Samos and the Heraion of Argos in the Argolis, were the very earliest monumental Greek temples constructed, in the 8th century BCE.

Importance
According to Walter Burkert, both Hera and Demeter have many characteristic attributes of Pre-Greek Great Goddesses.

In the same vein, British scholar Charles Francis Keary suggests that Hera had some sort of "Earth Goddess" worship in ancient times, connected to her possible origin as a Pelasgian goddess (as mentioned by Herodotus).

According to Homeric Hymn II to Delian Apollo, Hera detained Eileithyia to prevent Leto from going into labor with Artemis and Apollo, since the father was Zeus. The other goddesses present at the birthing on Delos sent Iris to bring her. As she stepped upon the island, the divine birth began. In the myth of the birth of Heracles, it is Hera herself who sits at the door, delaying the birth of Heracles until her protégé, Eurystheus, had been born first.

The Homeric Hymn to Pythian Apollo makes the monster Typhaon the offspring of archaic Hera in her Minoan form, produced out of herself, like a monstrous version of Hephaestus, and whelped in a cave in Cilicia. She gave the creature to Python to raise.

In the Temple of Hera, Olympia, Hera's seated cult figure was older than the warrior figure of Zeus that accompanied it. Homer expressed her relationship with Zeus delicately in the Iliad, in which she declares to Zeus, "I am Cronus' eldest daughter, and am honourable not on this ground only, but also because I am your wife, and you are king of the gods."

Matriarchy
There has been considerable scholarship, reaching back to Johann Jakob Bachofen in the mid-nineteenth century, about the possibility that Hera, whose early importance in Greek religion is firmly established, was originally the goddess of a matriarchal people, presumably inhabiting Greece before the Hellenes. In this view, her activity as goddess of marriage established the patriarchal bond of her own subordination: her resistance to the conquests of Zeus is rendered as Hera's "jealousy", the main theme of literary anecdotes that undercut her ancient cult.

However, it remains a controversial claim that an ancient matriarchy or a cultural focus on a monotheistic Great Goddess existed among the ancient Greeks or elsewhere. The claim is generally rejected by modern scholars as insufficiently evidenced.

Youth
Hera was most known as the matron goddess, Hera Teleia; but she presided over weddings as well. In myth and cult, fragmentary references and archaic practices remain of the sacred marriage of Hera and Zeus. At Plataea, there was a sculpture of Hera seated as a bride by Callimachus, as well as the matronly standing Hera.

Hera was also worshipped as a virgin: there was a tradition in Stymphalia in Arcadia that there had been a triple shrine to Hera the Girl (Παις [Pais]), the Adult Woman (Τελεια [Teleia]), and the Separated (Χήρη [Chḗrē] 'Widowed' or 'Divorced'). In the region around Argos, the temple of Hera in Hermione near Argos was to Hera the Virgin. At the spring of Kanathos, close to Nauplia, Hera renewed her virginity annually, in rites that were not to be spoken of (arrheton). Robert Graves interprets this as a representation of the new moon (Hebe), full moon (Hera), and old moon (Hecate), respectively personifying the Virgin (Spring), the Mother (Summer), and the destroying Crone (Autumn).

Emblems

In Hellenistic imagery, Hera's chariot was pulled by peacocks, birds not known to Greeks before the conquests of Alexander. Alexander's tutor, Aristotle, refers to it as "the Persian bird." The peacock motif was revived in the Renaissance iconography that unified Hera and Juno, which European painters focused on. A bird that had been associated with Hera on an archaic level, where most of the Aegean goddesses were associated with "their" bird, was the cuckoo, which appears in mythic fragments concerning the first wooing of a virginal Hera by Zeus.

Her archaic association was primarily with cattle, as a Cow Goddess, who was especially venerated in "cattle-rich" Euboea. On Cyprus, very early archaeological sites contain bull skulls that have been adapted for use as masks (see Bull (mythology)). Her familiar Homeric epithet Boôpis, is always translated "cow-eyed". In this respect, Hera bears some resemblance to the Ancient Egyptian deity Hathor, a maternal goddess associated with cattle.

Scholar of Greek mythology Walter Burkert writes in Greek Religion, "Nevertheless, there are memories of an earlier aniconic representation, as a pillar in Argos and as a plank in Samos."

Epithets
Hera bore several epithets in the mythological tradition, including:
 Ἀλέξανδρος (Alexandros) 'Protector of Men' (Alexandros) (among the Sicyonians)
 Αἰγοφάγος (Aigophágos) 'Goat-Eater' (among the Lacedaemonians)
 Ἀκραῖα (Akráia) '(She) of the Heights'
 Ἀμμωνία (Ammonia)
 Ἄνθεια (Antheia), meaning flowery
 Ἀργεία (Argéia) '(She) of Argos'
 Βασίλεια (Basíleia) 'Queen'
 Βουναία (Bounáia) '(She) of the Mound' (in Corinth)
 Βοῶπις (Boṓpis) 'Cow-Eyed' or 'Cow-Faced'
 Λευκώλενος (Leukṓlenos) 'White-Armed'
 Παῖς (Pais) 'Child' (in her role as virgin)
 Παρθένος (Parthénos) 'Virgin'
 Τελεία (Teléia) (as goddess of marriage)
 Χήρη (Chḗrē) 'Widowed'
 Τελχινία (Telchinia), Diodorus Siculus write that she was worshiped by the Ialysians and the Cameirans (both were on the island of Rhodes). She was named like that because according to a legend, Telchines (Τελχῖνες) were the first inhabitants of the island and also the first who created statues of gods.
 Ζυγία (Zygia), as the presider over marriage. Her husband Zeus had also the epithet Zygius (Ζυγίος). These epithets describing them as presiding over marriage.

Mythology

Birth

Hera is the daughter of the youngest Titan Cronus and his wife, and sister, Rhea. Cronus was fated to be overthrown by one of his children; to prevent this, he swallowed all of his newborn children whole until Rhea tricked him into swallowing a stone instead of her youngest child, Zeus. Zeus grew up in secret and when he grew up he tricked his father into regurgitating his siblings, including Hera. Zeus then led the revolt against the Titans, banished them, and divided the dominion over the world with his brothers Poseidon and Hades.

However, other traditions indicate that, like Zeus and Poseidon, Hera may not have been swallowed by Cronus. Pausanias states that she was nursed as an infant by the three daughters of the river Asterion: Euboia, Prosymna, and Akraia. Furthermore, in the Iliad, Hera states she was given by her mother to Tethys to be raised: "I go now to the ends of the generous earth on a visit to the Ocean, whence the gods have risen, and Tethys our mother who brought me up kindly in their own house, and cared for me and took me from Rheia, at that time when Zeus of the wide brows drove Kronos underneath the earth and the barren water."

Marriage with Zeus
Hera is the goddess of marriage and childbirth rather than motherhood, and much of her mythology revolves around her marriage with her brother Zeus. She is charmed by him and she seduces him; he cheats on her and has many children with other goddesses and mortal women; she is intensely jealous and vindictive towards his children and their mothers; he is threatening and violent to her.

In the Iliad, Zeus implies their marriage was some sort of elopement, as they lay secretly from their parents. Pausanias records a tale of how they came to be married in which Zeus transformed into a cuckoo to woo Hera. She caught the bird and kept it as her pet; this is why the cuckoo is seated on her sceptre. According to a scholion on Theocritus' Idylls when Hera was heading toward Mount Thornax alone, Zeus created a terrible storm and transformed himself into a cuckoo who flew down and sat on her lap. Hera covered him with her cloak. Zeus then transformed back and took hold of her; because she was refusing to sleep with him due to their mother, he promised to marry her.

In one account Hera refused to marry Zeus and hid in a cave to avoid him; an earthborn man named Achilles convinced her to give him a chance, and thus the two had their first sexual intercourse. A variation goes that Hera had been reared by a nymph named Macris on the island of Euboea, but Zeus stole her away, where Mt. Cithaeron, in the words of Plutarch, "afforded them a shady recess". When Macris came to look for her ward, the mountain-god Cithaeron drove her away, saying that Zeus was taking his pleasure there with Leto.

According to Callimachus, their wedding feast lasted three hundred years. The Apples of the Hesperides that Heracles was tasked by Eurystheus to take were a wedding gift by Gaia to the couple.

After a quarrel with Zeus, Hera left him and retreated to Euboea, and no word from Zeus managed to sway her mind. Cithaeron, the local king, then advised Zeus to take a wooden statue of a woman, wrap it up, and pretend to marry it. Zeus did as told, claiming "she" was Plataea, Asopus's daughter. Hera, once she heard the news, disrupted the wedding ceremony and tore away the dress from the figure only to discover it was but a lifeless statue, and not a rival in love. The queen and her king were reconciled, and to commemorate this the people there celebrated a festival called Daedala. During the festival, a re-enactment of the myth was celebrated, where a wooden statue of Hera was chosen, bathed in the river Asopus and then raised on a chariot to lead the procession like a bride, and then ritually burned.

According to Diodorus Siculus, Alcmene, the mother of Heracles, was the very last mortal woman Zeus ever slept with; following the birth of Heracles, he ceased to beget humans altogether.

Heracles 

Hera is the stepmother and enemy of Heracles. The name Heracles means "Glory of Hera". In Homer's Iliad, when Alcmene was about to give birth to Heracles, Zeus announced to all the gods that on that day a child by Zeus himself, would be born and rule all those around him. Hera, after requesting Zeus to swear an oath to that effect, descended from Olympus to Argos and made the wife of Sthenelus (son of Perseus) give birth to Eurystheus after only seven months, while at the same time preventing Alcmene from delivering Heracles. This resulted in the fulfillment of Zeus's oath in that it was Eurystheus rather than Heracles. In Pausanias' recounting, Hera sent witches (as they were called by the Thebans) to hinder Alcmene's delivery of Heracles. The witches were successful in preventing the birth until Historis, daughter of Tiresias, thought of a trick to deceive the witches. Like Galanthis, Historis announced that Alcmene had delivered her child; having been deceived, the witches went away, allowing Alcmene to give birth.

Hera's wrath against Zeus' son continues and while Heracles is still an infant, Hera sends two serpents to kill him as he lies in his cot. Heracles throttles the snakes with his bare hands and is found by his nurse playing with their limp bodies as if they were a child's toy.

One account of the origin of the Milky Way is that Zeus had tricked Hera into nursing the infant Heracles: discovering who he was, she pulled him from her breast, and a spurt of her milk formed the smear across the sky that can be seen to this day. Her milk also created a white flower, the lily. Unlike any Greeks, the Etruscans instead pictured a full-grown bearded Heracles at Hera's breast: this may refer to his adoption by her when he became an Immortal. He had previously wounded her severely in the breast.

When Heracles reached adulthood, Hera drove him mad, which led him to murder his family and this later led to him undertaking his famous labours. Hera assigned Heracles to labour for King Eurystheus at Mycenae. She attempted to make almost all of Heracles' twelve labours more difficult. When he fought the Lernaean Hydra, she sent a crab to bite at his feet in the hopes of distracting him. Later Hera stirred up the Amazons against him when he was on one of his quests. When Heracles took the cattle of Geryon, he shot Hera in the right breast with a triple-barbed arrow: the wound was incurable and left her in constant pain, as Dione tells Aphrodite in the Iliad, Book V. Afterwards, Hera sent a gadfly to bite the cattle, irritate them and scatter them. Hera then sent a flood which raised the water level of a river so much that Heracles could not ford the river with the cattle. He piled stones into the river to make the water shallower. When he finally reached the court of Eurystheus, the cattle were sacrificed to Hera.

Eurystheus also wanted to sacrifice the Cretan Bull to Hera. She refused the sacrifice because it reflected glory on Heracles. The bull was released and wandered to Marathon, becoming known as the Marathonian Bull.

Some myths state that in the end, Heracles befriended Hera by saving her from Porphyrion, a giant who tried to rape her during the Gigantomachy, and that she even gave her daughter Hebe as his bride. Whatever myth-making served to account for an archaic representation of Heracles as "Hera's man" it was thought suitable for the builders of the Heraion at Paestum to depict the exploits of Heracles in bas-reliefs.

Leto and the Twins: Apollo and Artemis 
When Hera discovered that Leto was pregnant and that Zeus was the father, she convinced the nature spirits to prevent Leto from giving birth on terra-firma, the mainland, any island at sea, or any place under the sun. Poseidon gave pity to Leto and guided her to the floating island of Delos, which was neither mainland nor a real island where Leto was able to give birth to her children. Afterwards, Zeus secured Delos to the bottom of the ocean. The island later became sacred to Apollo. Alternatively, Hera kidnapped Eileithyia, the goddess of childbirth, to prevent Leto from going into labor. The other gods bribed Hera with a beautiful necklace nobody could resist and she finally gave in.

Either way, Artemis was born first and then assisted with the birth of Apollo. Some versions say Artemis helped her mother give birth to Apollo for nine days. Another variation states that Artemis was born one day before Apollo, on the island of Ortygia and that she helped Leto cross the sea to Delos the next day to give birth to Apollo.

Later, Tityos attempted to rape Leto at the behest of Hera. He was slain by Artemis and Apollo.

This account of the birth of Apollo and Artemis is contradicted by Hesiod in Theogony, as the twins are born prior to Zeus’ marriage to Hera.

Io and Argus

The myth of Io has many forms and embellishments. Generally, Io was a priestess of Hera at the Heraion of Argos. Zeus lusted after her and either Hera turned Io into a heifer to hide her from Zeus, or Zeus did so to hide her from Hera but was discovered. Hera had Io tethered to an olive-tree and set Argus Panoptes to watch over her, but Zeus sent Hermes to kill him. Infuriated, Hera then sent a gadfly (Greek , compare oestrus) to pursue and constantly sting Io, who fled into Asia and eventually reached Egypt. There Zeus restored her to human form and she gave birth to his son Epaphus.

Judgment of Paris 

A prophecy stated that a son of the sea-nymph Thetis, with whom Zeus fell in love after gazing upon her in the oceans off the Greek coast, would become greater than his father. Possibly for this reason, Thetis was betrothed to an elderly human king, Peleus son of Aeacus, either upon Zeus' orders, or because she wished to please Hera, who had raised her. All the gods and goddesses as well as various mortals were invited to the marriage of Peleus and Thetis (the eventual parents of Achilles) and brought many gifts. Only Eris, goddess of discord, was not invited and was stopped at the door by Hermes, on Zeus' order. She was annoyed at this, so she threw from the door a gift of her own: a golden apple inscribed with the word καλλίστῃ (kallistēi, "To the fairest"). Aphrodite, Hera, and Athena all claimed to be the fairest, and thus the rightful owner of the apple.

The goddesses quarreled bitterly over it, and none of the other gods would venture an opinion favoring one, for fear of earning the enmity of the other two. They chose to place the matter before Zeus, who, not wanting to favor one of the goddesses, put the choice into the hands of Paris, a Trojan prince. After bathing in the spring of Mount Ida where Troy was situated, they appeared before Paris to have him choose. The goddesses undressed before him, either at his request or for the sake of winning. Still, Paris could not decide, as all three were ideally beautiful, so they resorted to bribes. Hera offered Paris political power and control of all of Asia, while Athena offered wisdom, fame, and glory in battle, and Aphrodite offered the most beautiful mortal woman in the world as a wife, and he accordingly chose her. This woman was Helen, who was, unfortunately for Paris, already married to King Menelaus of Sparta. The other two goddesses were enraged by this and through Helen's abduction by Paris, they brought about the Trojan War.

The Iliad 
Hera plays a substantial role in The Iliad, appearing in several books throughout the epic poem. She hates the Trojans because of Paris' decision that Aphrodite was the most beautiful goddess, and so supports the Greeks during the war. Throughout the epic, Hera makes many attempts to thwart the Trojan army. In books 1 and 2, Hera declares that the Trojans must be destroyed. Hera persuades Athena to aid the Achaeans in battle and she agrees to assist with interfering on their behalf.

In book 5, Hera and Athena plot to harm Ares, who had been seen by Diomedes in assisting the Trojans. Diomedes called for his soldiers to fall back slowly. Hera, Ares' mother, saw Ares' interference and asked Zeus, Ares' father, for permission to drive Ares away from the battlefield. Hera encouraged Diomedes to attack Ares and he threw his spear at the god. Athena drove the spear into Ares' body, and he bellowed in pain and fled to Mount Olympus, forcing the Trojans to fall back.

In book 8, Hera tries to persuade Poseidon to disobey Zeus and help the Achaean army. He refuses, saying he doesn't want to go against Zeus. Determined to intervene in the war, Hera and Athena head to the battlefield. However, seeing the two flee, Zeus sent Iris to intercept them and make them return to Mount Olympus or face grave consequences. After prolonged fighting, Hera sees Poseidon aiding the Greeks and giving them the motivation to keep fighting.

In book 14 Hera devises a plan to deceive Zeus. Zeus set a decree that the gods were not allowed to interfere in the mortal war. Hera is on the side of the Achaeans, so she plans a Deception of Zeus where she seduces him, with help from Aphrodite, and tricks him into a deep sleep, with the help of Hypnos, so that the Gods could interfere without the fear of Zeus.

In book 21, Hera continues her interference with the battle as she tells Hephaestus to prevent the river from harming Achilles. Hephaestus sets the battlefield ablaze, causing the river to plead with Hera, promising her he will not help the Trojans if Hephaestus stops his attack. Hephaestus stops his assault and Hera returns to the battlefield where the gods begin to fight amongst themselves.

Minor stories

Semele and Dionysus

When Hera learned that Semele, daughter of Cadmus King of Thebes, was pregnant by Zeus, she disguised herself as Semele's nurse and persuaded the princess to insist that Zeus show himself to her in his true form. When he was compelled to do so, having sworn by Styx, his thunder and lightning destroyed Semele. Zeus took Semele's unborn child, Dionysus, and completed its gestation sewn into his own thigh.

In another version, Dionysus was originally the son of Zeus by either Demeter or Persephone. Hera sent her Titans to rip the baby apart, from which he was called Zagreus ("Torn in Pieces"). Zeus rescued the heart; or, the heart was saved, variously, by Athena, Rhea, or Demeter. Zeus used the heart to recreate Dionysus and implant him in the womb of Semele—hence Dionysus became known as "the twice-born". Certain versions imply that Zeus gave Semele the heart to eat to impregnate her. Hera tricked Semele into asking Zeus to reveal his true form, which killed her. Dionysus later managed to rescue his mother from the underworld and have her live on Mount Olympus.

Lamia
Lamia was a lovely queen of Libya, whom Zeus loved and slept with. Hera in jealousy robbed Lamia of her children, either by kidnapping and hiding them away, killing them, or causing Lamia herself to kill her own offspring. Lamia became disfigured from the torment, transforming into a terrifying being who hunted and killed the children of others.

Gerana
Gerana was a queen of the Pygmies who boasted she was more beautiful than Hera. The wrathful goddess turned her into a crane and proclaimed that her bird descendants should wage eternal war on the Pygmy folk.

Cydippe
Cydippe, a priestess of Hera, was on her way to a festival in the goddess' honor. The oxen which were to pull her cart were overdue and her sons, Biton and Cleobis, pulled the cart the entire way (45 stadia, 8 kilometers). Cydippe was impressed with their devotion to her and Hera, and so asked Hera to give her children the best gift a god could give a person. Hera ordained that the brothers would die in their sleep.

This honor bestowed upon the children was later used by Solon as proof when trying to convince Croesus that it is impossible to judge a person's happiness until they have died a fruitful death after a joyous life.

Tiresias
Tiresias was a priest of Zeus, and as a young man, he encountered two snakes mating and hit them with a stick. He was then transformed into a woman. As a woman, Tiresias became a priestess of Hera, married, and had children, including Manto. After seven years as a woman, Tiresias again found mating snakes; depending on the myth, either she made sure to leave the snakes alone this time, or, according to Hyginus, trampled on them and became a man once more.

As a result of his experiences, Zeus and Hera asked him to settle the question of which sex, male or female, experienced more pleasure during intercourse. Zeus claimed it was women; Hera claimed it was men. When Tiresias sided with Zeus, Hera struck him blind. Since Zeus could not undo what she had done, he gave him the gift of prophecy.

An alternative and less commonly told story has it that Tiresias was blinded by Athena after he stumbled onto her bathing naked. His mother, Chariclo, begged her to undo her curse, but Athena could not; she gave him a prophecy instead.

Chelone
At the marriage of Zeus and Hera, a nymph named Chelone was disrespectful or refused to attend the wedding. Zeus thus turned her into a tortoise.

The Golden Fleece
Hera hated Pelias because he had killed Sidero, his step-grandmother, in one of the goddess's temples. She later convinced Jason and Medea to kill Pelias. The Golden Fleece was the item that Jason needed to get his mother freed.

Ixion
When Zeus had pity on Ixion and brought him to Olympus and introduced him to the gods, instead of being grateful, Ixion grew lustful for Hera. Zeus found out about his intentions and made a cloud in the shape of Hera, who was later named Nephele, and tricked Ixion into coupling with it. From their union came Centaurus. So Ixion was expelled from Olympus and Zeus ordered Hermes to bind Ixion to a winged fiery wheel that was always spinning. Therefore, Ixion was bound to a burning solar wheel for all eternity, first spinning across the heavens, but in later myth transferred to Tartarus.

Children

Genealogy

Art and events
 Barberini Hera - a Roman sculpture of Hera/Juno
 Hera Borghese - a sculpture related to Hera
 Hera Farnese - a sculpture of Hera's head
 Heraea Games - games dedicated to Hera—the first sanctioned (and recorded) women's athletic competition to be held in the stadium at Olympia.

See also

 Auðumbla, a primeval cow in Norse mythology
 Parvati

Footnotes

Notes

References
 Apollodorus, Apollodorus, The Library, with an English Translation by Sir James George Frazer, F.B.A., F.R.S. in 2 Volumes. Cambridge, MA, Harvard University Press; London, William Heinemann Ltd. 1921. Online version at the Perseus Digital Library.
 Burkert, Walter, Greek Religion 1985.
 Burkert, Walter, The Orientalizing Revolution: Near Eastern Influence on Greek Culture in the Early Archaic Age, 1998
 Farnell, Lewis Richard, The cults of the Greek states I: Zeus, Hera Athena Oxford, 1896.
 
 Gantz, Timothy, Early Greek Myth: A Guide to Literary and Artistic Sources, Johns Hopkins University Press, 1996, Two volumes:  (Vol. 1),  (Vol. 2).
 Graves, Robert, The Greek Myths 1955. Use with caution.
 Hard, Robin, The Routledge Handbook of Greek Mythology: Based on H.J. Rose's "Handbook of Greek Mythology", Psychology Press, 2004, . Google Books.
 Hesiod, Theogony, in The Homeric Hymns and Homerica with an English Translation by Hugh G. Evelyn-White, Cambridge, MA., Harvard University Press; London, William Heinemann Ltd. 1914. Online version at the Perseus Digital Library.
 Homer, The Iliad with an English Translation by A.T. Murray, Ph.D. in two volumes. Cambridge, MA., Harvard University Press; London, William Heinemann, Ltd. 1924. Online version at the Perseus Digital Library.
 Homer; The Odyssey with an English Translation by A.T. Murray, PH.D. in two volumes. Cambridge, MA., Harvard University Press; London, William Heinemann, Ltd. 1919. Online version at the Perseus Digital Library.
 Evelyn-White, Hugh, The Homeric Hymns and Homerica with an English Translation by Hugh G. Evelyn-White. Homeric Hymns. Cambridge, Massachusetts, Harvard University Press; London, William Heinemann Ltd. 1914.
 
 Pindar, Odes, Diane Arnson Svarlien. 1990. Online version at the Perseus Digital Library.
 Ovid, Metamorphoses. Translated by A. D. Melville; introduction and notes by E. J. Kenney. Oxford: Oxford University Press. 2008. .
 Hyginus, Gaius Julius, The Myths of Hyginus. Edited and translated by Mary A. Grant, Lawrence: University of Kansas Press, 1960.
 Pausanias, Pausanias Description of Greece with an English Translation by W.H.S. Jones, Litt.D., and H.A. Ormerod, M.A., in 4 Volumes. Cambridge, MA, Harvard University Press; London, William Heinemann Ltd. 1918. Online version at the Perseus Digital Library.
 Nonnus, Dionysiaca; translated by Rouse, W H D, III Books XXXVI–XLVIII. Loeb Classical Library No. 346, Cambridge, Massachusetts, Harvard University Press; London, William Heinemann Ltd. 1940. Internet Archive.
 Kerenyi, Carl, The Gods of the Greeks 1951 (paperback 1980)
 Kerenyi, Karl, 1959. The Heroes of the Greeks Especially Heracles.
 Kirk, G. S., J. E. Raven, M. Schofield, The Presocratic Philosophers: A Critical History with a Selection of Texts, Cambridge University Press, Dec 29, 1983. .
 Ogden, Daniel (2013a), Drakon: Dragon Myth and Serpent Cult in the Greek and Roman Worlds, Oxford University Press, 2013. .
  .
 Ruck, Carl A.P., and Danny Staples, The World of Classical Myth 1994
 Seyffert, Oskar. Dictionary of Classical Antiquities 1894. (On-line text)
 Seznec, Jean, The Survival of the Pagan Gods : Mythological Tradition in Renaissance Humanism and Art, 1953
   ) Concentrating on family structure in 5th-century Athens; some of the crude usage of myth and drama for psychological interpreting of "neuroses" is dated.
 Smith, William; Dictionary of Greek and Roman Biography and Mythology, London (1873). "Gali'nthias"

External links

 Theoi Project, Hera Hera in classical literature and Greek art
 The Heraion at Samos

 
Children of Cronus
Marriage goddesses
Queens in Greek mythology
Metamorphoses characters
Deities in the Iliad
Mythological rape victims
Mythology of Heracles
Divine women of Zeus
Characters in the Odyssey
Deities in the Aeneid
Greek goddesses
Queens of Heaven (antiquity)
Mothers of the twelve Olympians
Childhood goddesses
Characters in the Argonautica
Household deities
Domestic and hearth deities
Women of the Trojan war
Health goddesses
Twelve Olympians
Shapeshifters in Greek mythology
Cattle deities